Janusz Andrzej Jojko  (born 20 April 1960, in Chorzów) is a Polish football coach and former professional footballer who played for Ruch Chorzów, GKS Katowice and KSZO Ostrowiec Świętokrzyski in the Polish Ekstraklasa. He is currently the goalkeeper coach of GKS Katowice and has also been the caretaker of the club since the former manager Jerzy Brzęczek was sacked in May 2017

Club career
Jojko began his professional career with Ruch Chorzów, and played in 117 league matches over eight seasons. During the 1986–87 season, he scored an infamous and bizarre own goal in a playout match against Lechia Gdańsk, and never played for the club again.

In 1988, Jojko moved to GKS Katowice where he spent the next ten seasons and amassed 276 league appearances. Following the 1996–97 season, he moved to KSZO where he appeared in another 24 Ekstraklasa league matches before his retirement.

International career
Jojko made two appearances for the Poland national football team, his debut coming in a friendly match against Finland in 1987.

References

External links
 

1960 births
Living people
Polish footballers
Poland international footballers
KSZO Ostrowiec Świętokrzyski players
GKS Katowice players
Ruch Chorzów players
Ekstraklasa players
Sportspeople from Chorzów
Association football goalkeepers